Domestic is an unincorporated community in Nottingham Township, Wells County, in the U.S. state of Indiana.

History
A post office was established at Domestic in 1884, and remained in operation until 1905. An old variant name of the community was called Ringville.

Geography

References

Unincorporated communities in Wells County, Indiana
Unincorporated communities in Indiana